Gerolama Orsini (1504–1569) sometimes Girolama Orsini was the Duchess of Parma as the wife of Pier Luigi Farnese, Duke of Parma. She served as Regent (Governor) of the Ducky of Castro in the name of her son Orazio, Duke of Castro between 1550 and 1553.

Biography

Born in Pitigliano, she was the daughter of Lodovico Orsini and Giulia Conti. In 1513 an engagement contract between Orsini and Pier Luigi Farnese was drawn up, and in 1519 the wedding celebrated at Valentano. Her husband was the illegitimate son of Pope Paul III and Silvia Ruffino. The couple had five children three of which would have further progeny. 

When Cardinal Alessandro Farnese became Pope Paul III in 1534 he made his son Pier Luigi captain-general of the Church and in 1537 duke of Castro and finally in 1545 Duke of Parma and Piacenza. Gerolama remained in Rome and maintained the family presence at the court of the Pope. She was described as a sensible person capable of making important descisions when necessary, and close to the Pope and the interests of her sons. She lived a retired life, but was always actively engaged in maintainng the political interest of her sons. 

She was widowed in 1547, and remained in Rome. When Pope Paul III died in 1549, Gerolama unsuccessfully attempted to work for the candidacy of a Pope beneficial to the Farnese family. In 1550, Gerolama was appointed the regent-governor of the Duchy of Castro in the absence of her son. Castro was occupied by Papal troops the same year. Gerolama maintained her regency by not resisting, and yet continuing to excert her authority while working for the end of the Papal occupation, and finnally managed to achieve the end of the Papal occupation in 1552. Her regency ended when she was informed of the death of her son Orazio in 1553, and she departed for Parma, where she settled for the rest of her life. 

She died at the Palazzo Farnese Piacenza in 1590. She was buried at the Farnese crypt at the Sanctuary of Santa Maria della Steccata, Parma.

Issue
Vittoria Farnese (10 August 1519 – 13 December 1602) married Guidobaldo della Rovere, Duke of Urbino and had issue.
Alessandro Farnese (5 October 1520 – 2 March 1589) never married.
Ottavio Farnese, Duke of Parma (9 October 1524 – 18 September 1586) married Margaret of Parma and had issue.
Ranuccio Farnese (11 August 1530 – 1565) died unmarried.
Orazio Farnese, Duke of Castro (1532 – 18 July 1558) married Diane de France no issue.

References

1504 births
1590 deaths
Gerolama
House of Farnese
Gerolama
16th-century Italian nobility
16th-century Italian women
Duchesses of Castro
Burials at the Sanctuary of Santa Maria della Steccata
Nobility from Rome
People from Pitigliano
16th-century women rulers
16th-century viceregal rulers